Danilo Bach (born March 1, 1944) is an American screenwriter and film producer.

Awards and nominations 
 Best Original Screenplay (Nomination) for Beverly Hills Cop, 1984

Filmography 
 The Beast Within (uncredited) (1982)
 Beverly Hills Cop (1984)
 April Fool's Day (1986)
 Beverly Hills Cop II (1987; characters created by)
 Someone to Watch Over Me (uncredited) (1987)
 Beverly Hills Cop III (1994; characters created by)
 Escape Clause (1996)
 14 Hours (2005)

References

External links 
 

1944 births
Living people
American male screenwriters
American film producers